

Present

Play-by-play
 Chris Fowler
 Sean McDonough
 Joe Tessitore
 Mark Jones
 Dave Pasch
 Bob Wischusen
 Dave Flemming
 Anish Shroff
 Beth Mowins
 Brian Custer
 Matt Barrie
 Clay Matvick
 John Schriffen
 Tom Hart
 Dave O'Brien
 Lowell Galindo
 Jay Alter 
 Courtney Lyle
 Tiffany Greene
 Mike Morgan
 Bill Roth

Analysts
 Kirk Herbstreit
 Greg McElroy
 Dusty Dvoracek
 Dan Orlovsky
 Robert Griffin III
 Rod Gilmore
 Tom Luginbill
 Kirk Morrison
 Andre Ware
 Kelly Stouffer
 Rocky Boiman
 Jay Walker
 Rene Ingoglia
 Dustin Fox
 Joey Galloway
 Eric Wood

Sideline reporters
Rocky Boiman
Paul Carcaterra
Taylor McGregor
Katie George
Quint Kessenich
Tom Luginbill
Molly McGrath
Todd McShay
Holly Rowe
Laura Rutledge

Studio hosts
Matt Barrie
Kevin Connors
Chris Cotter
Rece Davis
Kevin Negandhi

Studio analysts
Kirk Herbstreit
Lee Corso
Desmond Howard
David Pollack
Joey Galloway
Jesse Palmer
Booger McFarland
Trevor Matich
Andre Ware
Greg McElroy
Sam Acho

Former

Play-by-play
Adam Amin
Dave Barnett
Gary Bender
Jason Benetti
Allen Bestwick
Craig Bolerjack
Tim Brando
Bob Carpenter
Jack Corrigan
Dan Fouts
Ron Franklin (1988–2010)
Terry Gannon
Jerry Gross
Kevin Harlan
Jeff Hullinger
Jim Kelly
Dave LaMont
Wayne Larrivee
Steve Levy
Chris Lincoln
Mark Malone
Eamon McAnaney
Tom Mees
Joel Meyers
Brad Nessler
Mike Patrick (2 stints)
Jerry Punch
Bob Rathbun
Sam Rosen
Tim Ryan
Kevin Slaten-Jackson
Jim Simpson
Dave Sims
Charley Steiner
Jim Thacker
Gary Thorne
Mike Tirico
Rich Waltz
Pam Ward

Analysts
Irv Brown
Todd Blackledge
Dean Blevins
Todd Christensen
Lee Corso (1987-2005)
Ed Cunningham
Bill Curry (1997-2007)
Bob Davie (2002–2011)
Steve Davis
Gary Danielson (1990-2005)  
Mike Golic
Mike Golic Jr.
Mike Gottfried (1990-2007) 
Danny Kanell
Matt Hasselbeck
Lou Holtz (2005-2014)
Brock Huard
Craig James
Dan Jiggetts
Kevin Kiley
Shaun King
Paul Maguire (1980–1986, 2006–2008)
Mark May occasional games (2005–2016)
Pat McAfee
Don McPherson
Urban Meyer (2011)
Matt Millen
David Norrie
Chris Spielman (2001–2015)
Joe Theismann
Mike Tomczak
Gino Torretta
Tommy Tuberville (2017–2018)
Rick Walker
Gene Washington
Bud Wilkinson
Ken Willard
Randy Wright

Sideline reporters
Erin Andrews
Thea Andrews
Mike Adamle
Jack Arute
Dean Blevins</ref>
Heather Cox
Stacey Dales
Jimmy Dykes
Jeannine Edwards 
Alex Flanagan
Chris Fowler
Mike Golic
Kevin Guthrie
Todd Harris
Jemele Hill
Adrian Karsten
Neil Lomax
Jessica Mendoza
Samantha Ponder
Jerry Punch
Tom Rinaldi
Dave Ryan
Lisa Salters
Shannon Spake
Rob Stone
Maria Taylor
Rick Walker
Rich Waltz
Pam Ward
Allison Williams
Kellen Winslow
Matt Winer

Studio hosts
Tim Brando (1987)
Bob Carpenter (1988)
Linda Cohn
Wendi Nix
Mike Tirico
Stan Verrett
Adnan Virk

Studio analysts
Emmanuel Acho
Trev Alberts
Mack Brown
Gene Chizik
Beano Cook
Rod Gilmore
Danny Kanell
Lou Holtz
Craig James
Chip Kelly
Mark May
Jim Mora
Mark Sanchez
Robert Smith
Marcus Spears

See also
ESPN College Football broadcast teams

References

External links

ESPN College Football personalities
College Football personalities